This is a list of Maldivian films released in 2010.

Releases

Theatre releases

Short film

Television
This is a list of Maldivian series, in which the first episode was aired or streamed in 2010.

References 

Maldivian
2010